Glenwood is a large neighbourhood in west Edmonton, Alberta, Canada.  The neighbourhood has a mixture of residential and commercial development. Glenwood became a part of Edmonton in 1964, when the Town of Jasper Place amalgamated with Edmonton.

The neighbourhood is bounded on the north by Stony Plain Road, on the south by 95 Avenue, on the east by 156 Street and on the west by 170 Street.

The Edmonton Transit Service's Jasper Place terminal is located at the northeast corner of the neighbourhood.

The Edmonton Police Service west Edmonton headquarters is located in the north end of the neighbourhood at 100th Avenue and 165 Street.

The community is represented by the Glenwood Community League, established in 1939, which maintains a community hall and outdoor rink located at 164 Street and 97 Avenue.

Demographics 

Residential development 
Much of Glenwood was developed in the 35 years following the end of World War II, with three out of four residences being built between 1946 and 1980.  Almost half (49%) of the residences are single-family dwellings, with an almost equal proportion (46%) of apartments.  Another 4% of residences are duplexes, with 2% of the residences being row houses.  Over half (55%) or residences are rented, with just under half (45%) being owner occupied.

Schools 
There are six schools located in Glenwood.  Three are operated by the Edmonton Public School System, one is operated by the Edmonton Catholic School System, and two are independent.

Edmonton Public Schools
 Glendale Elementary School
 Meadowlark Christian School (Former Our Lady of Fatima Catholic School)
 Westlawn Junior High School

Edmonton Catholic Schools
 St. Thomas More Junior High School

Independently Operated Schools
 Britannia A M I Montessori School
 Crestwood Montessori School

The Edmonton Public School System's Jasper Place High School and the Edmonton Catholic School System's St. Francis Xavier High School are both located just to the south of Glenwood in the neighbourhood of West Meadowlark Park.

Jasper Place Transit Centre 

The Jasper Place Transit Centre is located on the northern end of the neighborhood at 157 Street and Stony Plain Road. There are few amenities at this transit centre except for a shelter and pay phone (there are no washrooms, park and ride, drop off areas, or vending machines).

The transit centre reopened on April 9, 2020 after it underwent a $5.6 million overhaul of the bus ways, sidewalks, medians, and shelter, among other changes, as part of a city-wide $37.75 million transit centre improvement initiative. $3.639 million in funding for the Jasper Place Transit Centre renewal project was provided by the federal government.

The following bus routes serve the transit centre:

Surrounding neighbourhoods

See also 
 Edmonton Federation of Community Leagues
 Edmonton Transit Service

References

External links 
 Glenwood Neighbourhood Profile
 Glenwood Community League

Neighbourhoods in Edmonton
Edmonton Transit Service transit centres